The 1894 New South Wales colonial election was for 125 electoral districts, with each district returning one member. The election was conducted on the basis of a simple majority or first-past-the-post voting system. There were three significant changes from the 1891 election, the abolition of multi-member constituencies, the abolition of plural voting where an elector had property or residence in more than one electorate and that polls for every district were held on the same day. The number of seats was reduced from 141 to 125. In this election, in 74 electorates the winning candidate received less than 50% of the votes, while 1 was uncontested. The average number of enrolled voters per electorate was 2,046, ranging from Lismore (1,360) to Marrickville (2,924).

Election results

Albury

Alma

Annandale

Argyle
			
			

			
			
			
|   |
| colspan="2"   |  win
| colspan="3" style="text-align:center;" | (previously 2 members)
			
Thomas Rose (Protectionist) was one of two sitting members for Argyle. The second member, William Holborow (Free Trade), did not contest the election.

Armidale
			
			
			

			
			
			
			
			
Henry Copeland (Protectionist) and Edmund Lonsdale (Free Trade) were sitting members for New England. The third member for New England, James Inglis (Free Trade) did not contest the election.

Ashburnham

Ashfield

Ballina

Balmain North

Balmain South

The Barwon
			
			
			
			
			
			

			
			
			
			

The Barwon consisted of part of Bourke and parts of the abolished districts of The Bogan and The Namoi. William Willis (Protectionist) was one of the members for Bourke.

Bathurst

Bega

Bingara

Boorowa

Botany

Bourke
			
			
			

			
			
			
|   |
| colspan="2"   |  win
| colspan="3" style="text-align:center;" | (previously 3 members)

Bourke was reduced in size and parts were given to the new districts of Cobar and The Barwon. Hugh Langwell (Independent Labour) was one of the members for Bourke. Of the other two members, Thomas Waddell (Protectionist) successfully contested Cobar and William Willis (Protectionist) successfully contested The Barwon.

Bowral

Braidwood

Broken Hill

Burwood

Camden
			
			
			

			
			
			
|   |
| colspan="2"   |  win
| colspan="3" style="text-align:center;" | (previously 3 members)

Canterbury
			
			
			
			

			
			
			
|   |
| colspan="2"   |  win
| colspan="3" style="text-align:center;" | (previously 4 members)

The Clarence

Cobar
			
			
			

			
			
			
			

Cobar consisted of part of Bourke and parts of the abolished districts of The Bogan and Forbes. Thomas Waddell (Protectionist) was one of the members for Bourke.

Condoublin

Coonamble

Cowra

Darlington

Deniliquin

Dubbo

Durham

East Maitland

Eden-Bombala

Glebe
			
			
			
			
			
			

			
			
			
|   |
| colspan="2"   |  win
| colspan="3" style="text-align:center;" | (previously 2 members)

Glen Innes
			
			
			
			

			
			
			
|   |
| colspan="2"   |  win
| colspan="3" style="text-align:center;" | (previously 2 members)

Gloucester

Goulburn

Grafton

Granville

Grenfell
			
			
			
			

			
			
			
			

The sitting member, Robert Vaughn had been elected as a  member at the 1891 election but stood as a  candidate for this election.

The result was overturned by the Elections and Qualifications Committee which conducted a re-count in October 1894.

Gundagai

Gunnedah

Hartley
			
			
			
			
			

			
			
			
|   |
| colspan="2"   |  win
| colspan="3" style="text-align:center;" | (previously 2 members)

The Hastings and The Macleay

The Hawkesbury
			
			
			
			

			
			

  |

Sydney Burdekin (Free Trade) was the sitting member for The Hawkesbury.

Hay

The Hume
			
			

			
			
			
|   |
| colspan="2"   |  win
| colspan="3" style="text-align:center;" | (previously 2 members)

Illawarra
			
			

			
			
			
|   |
| colspan="2"   |  win
| colspan="3" style="text-align:center;" | (previously 2 members)
			
Archibald Campbell (Free Trade) was one of two sitting members for Illawarra. The second member, John Nicholson (Labour) successfully contested the election for the new seat of Woronora.

Inverell

Kahibah

Kiama

The Lachlan

Leichhardt

Lismore

Macquarie

Manaro
			
			
			
			
			

			
			
			
|   |
| colspan="2"   |  win
| colspan="3" style="text-align:center;" | (previously 2 members)

The Manning

Marrickville
			
			
			
			
			
			
			

			
			
			
			
			
Marrickville was one of four new seats split out of the abolished seat of Newtown, the others being Newtown-Camperdown, Newtown-Erskine and Newtown-St Peters. The four sitting members for members for Newtown contested the other three seats.

Molong

Moree

Moruya

Mudgee
			
			
			
			
			

			
			

|   |
| colspan="2"   |  win
| colspan="3" style="text-align:center;" | (previously 3 members)

The Murray
			
			

			
			
			
|   |
| colspan="2"   |  win
| colspan="3" style="text-align:center;" | (previously 2 members)

The Murrumbidgee
			
			
			

			
			
			
|   |
| colspan="2"   |  win
| colspan="3" style="text-align:center;" | (previously 3 members)

Narrabri

The Nepean

Newcastle East

Newcastle West

Newtown-Camperdown
			
			
			
			

			
			
			
			
			
Newtown was split into four, Newtown-Camperdown, Newtown-Erskine, Newtown-St Peters and Marrickville. Joseph Abbott (Free Trade) was a sitting members for Newtown, while the other three sitting members contested Newtown-St Peters and Newtown-Erskine.

Newtown-Erskine
			
			
			
			

			
			
			
			
			
Newtown was split into four, Newtown-Camperdown, Newtown-Erskine, Newtown-St Peters and Marrickville. Edmund Molesworth (Free Trade) and John Hindle (Labour) were both sitting members for Newtown, while the other two sitting members contested Newtown-Camperdown and Newtown-St Peters.

Newtown-St Peters
			
			
			
			

			
			
			
			
			
Newtown was split into four, Newtown-Camperdown, Newtown-Erskine, Newtown-St Peters and Marrickville. Francis Cotton (Labour) was a sitting member for Newtown. The other three sitting members for Newtown contested Newtown-Camperdown and Newtown-Erskine. William Rigg (Independent Free Trade) was the Mayor of Newtown. John Bowes (Protectionist) was the sitting member for the abolished seat of Morpeth.

Northumberland
			
			
			

			
			
			
|   |
| colspan="2"   |  win
| colspan="3" style="text-align:center;" | (previously 3 members)

Orange
			
			
			

			
			
			
|   |
| colspan="2"   |  win
| colspan="3" style="text-align:center;" | (previously 2 members)

Paddington
			
			
			
			
			
			
			
			
			
			

			
			
			
|   |
| colspan="2"   |  win
| colspan="3" style="text-align:center;" | (previously 4 members)

Parramatta
			
			
			
			
			

			
			
			
			
			
Hugh Taylor (Free Trade) was the sitting member for Parramatta.

Petersham

Queanbeyan

Quirindi

Raleigh

Randwick

Redfern
			
			
			
			
			

			
			
			
|   |
| colspan="2"   |  win
| colspan="3" style="text-align:center;" | (previously 4 members)

The Richmond
			
			
			
			
			

			
			
			
|   |
| colspan="2"   |  win
| colspan="3" style="text-align:center;" | (previously 3 members)

Robertson

Ryde

Rylstone

St George

St Leonards
			
			
			
			
			

			
			
			
|   |
| colspan="2"   |  win
| colspan="3" style="text-align:center;" | (previously 3 members)

Sherbrooke

The Shoalhaven

Singleton

Sturt

Sydney-Belmore

Sydney-Bligh

Sydney-Cook

Sydney-Denison

Sydney-Fitzroy

Sydney-Flinders

Sydney-Gipps

Sydney-King

Sydney-Lang

Sydney-Phillip

Sydney-Pyrmont

Tamworth
			
			
			
			

			
			
			
|   |
| colspan="2"   |  win
| colspan="3" style="text-align:center;" | (previously 2 members)

Tenterfield

Tumut

The Tweed

Uralla-Walcha

Wagga Wagga

Wallsend

Waratah

Warringah

Waterloo

Waverley

Wellington

Wentworth
			
			

			
			

[[Joseph Palmer Abbott|Joseph Abbott]] had been appointed as Speaker in 1890, was listed as an independent and elected unopposed. While he retained the role of Speaker he was opposed for this election and stood as a Protectionist.

West Macquarie

West Maitland

Wickham

Wilcannia

Willoughby

Woollahra

Woronora

Yass
			
			
			

			
			
			
			

Yass Plains was renamed Yass. Thomas Colls (Protectionist) was the sitting member for Yass Plains.

Young
			
			
			
			

			
			
			
|   |
| colspan="2"   |  hold
| colspan="3" style="text-align:center;" | (previously 2 members)

Both John Gough and James Mackinnon had been elected as  candidates, however they refused to sign the pledge.

See also 

 Candidates of the 1894 New South Wales colonial election
 Members of the New South Wales Legislative Assembly, 1894–1895

References 

1894